Anne Phillips may refer to:

Anne Phillips (geologist) (1803–1862), English geologist
Anne Phillips (professor) (born 1950), British political scientist
Anne Phillips (singer), American singer

See also
Anne, Princess Royal, British royal formerly married to Mark Phillips
Anna Phillips (disambiguation), multiple people